Cassia County is a county in the U.S. state of Idaho. As of the 2020 Census the county had a population of 24,655. The county seat and largest city is Burley. Cassia County is included in the Burley, ID Micropolitan Statistical Area.

History
The first Europeans explored the Milner area in Cassia County in 1811. It was trappers who initially developed the Oregon Trail, which ran on the county's northern border. The Raft River's junction with the Oregon Trail marked the split for the California Trail.

While the Oregon and California trails brought hundreds of thousands of emigrants through Cassia County, it also brought settlers. A stage line through the county was established between Kelton, Utah and Boise, Idaho in 1869. A stage station existed at City of Rocks. Additional stations were spaced at increments of 10–12 miles between stations to include one at Oakley Meadows, in the Goose Creek valley two miles west of the present settlement of Oakley.

William Oakley settled at the Oakley Meadows station in 1870. Cattle operations also developed starting in 1872. Settlement began at nearby Albion in 1873 with significant Mormon settlement in 1875. By 1880, Albion had a population of 257. Mormon settlement at Oakley also began on June 1, 1878, when four Mormon men each staked out 160 acres for their settlement. Settlements remained primarily agricultural with more than 38,000 head of cattle in the area by 1885. Settlement at Malta occurred prior to 1890, as the Malta precinct had 172 residents at the 1890 census.

Albion State Normal School was established at Albion in 1893. The school was focused on training Idaho teachers until 1951 when its programs were transferred to Idaho State College (now Idaho State University) in Pocatello.

Burley was platted and settled in 1905 after a branch of the Oregon Shortline was constructed through the town. Declo was settled under the name of Marshfield by 1909.

Cassia County was created from Owyhee County on February 20, 1879, with Albion becoming the county seat. A western portion became Twin Falls County in 1907. The county assumed its present boundaries when an eastern portion became Power County on January 30, 1913. The county seat was moved to Burley in 1918. The county was named for Cassia Creek, which in turn was named either for John Cazier, a member of the Mormon Battalion and an emigrant train captain, or for a plant found in the area.

Government

Elected Officials
Similar to other Idaho counties, an elected three-member county commission heads the county government. Other elected officials include clerk, treasurer, sheriff, assessor, coroner, and prosecutor.

County Commission
 District 1: Leonard Beck (chair)
 District 2: Robert Kunau 
 District 3: Kent Searle 
Other Elected Officials 
 Clerk: Joseph Larsen
 Treasurer: Laura Greener
 Sheriff: George Warrell
 Assessor: Dwight Davis
 Coroner: Craig Rinehart
 Prosecuting Attorney: McCord Larsen

Cassia County is in Idaho's 2nd congressional district and represented by Congressman Mike Simpson. At the state level, Cassia County is in Legislative District 27, represented by Senator Kelly Anthon of Declo, Speaker Scott Bedke of Oakley and Fred Wood of Burley.

Politics
At every level, Cassia County is a Republican Party stronghold. All county-level offices are held by Republicans and have been for decades. Republican primaries are tantamount to election to office, as Democrats rarely field challenges for county or state legislative office. Cassia County is one of the most consistently Republican counties in the state, and in the gubernatorial election of 2010 Republican Butch Otter carried Cassia County with 76.54% to Democrat Keith Allred's 16.73%. In the presidential election of 2012, Mitt Romney, whose father lived for a few years in his youth in Oakley, carried Cassia County with 85.2% while Barack Obama received 13.1%. The last Democratic presidential candidate to carry Cassia County was Franklin Roosevelt in the election of 1940 edging out Wendell Willkie by around 100 votes.

State legislators from Cassia County traditionally hold their seats for long periods of time. Two of the longest serving legislators in Idaho history were from Cassia County: Vard Chatburn of Albion who served in the House of Representatives from 1957 to 1986 and Denton Darrington in the Senate who served from 1982 to 2012. Because legislators rarely lose their seats, legislators representing Cassia County are often in leadership or chair committees. Since 2012, Representative Bedke has served as Speaker of the House. Bruce Newcomb of Burley also served as Speaker from 1998 to 2006.

Though born in Burley, Congressman Simpson now lives in Idaho Falls. The only other member of congress with ties to the county is Henry Dworshak who represented Idaho's 2nd congressional district and later served in the Senate. He lived in Burley and was the publisher of the Burley Bulletin. A Burley elementary school is named after him.

Geography

The northern half of the county is part of the Magic Valley region of the Snake River Plain, and numerous mountain ranges extend north from the southern boundary and diminish as they approach the river, which flows from east to west.

The Silent City of Rocks National Reserve, containing exposed granitic batholith as old as 2.5 billion years, is located in the southern part of the county.

Adjacent Counties

Minidoka County - north
Blaine County - north
Power County - northeast
Oneida County - east
Box Elder County, Utah - southeast
Elko County, Nevada - southwest/Pacific Time Border
Twin Falls County - west
Jerome County - northwest

Highways
 Interstate 84
 Interstate 86
 US 30
 SH-27
 SH-77
 SH-81

National protected areas
 City of Rocks National Reserve
 Minidoka National Wildlife Refuge (part)
 Sawtooth National Forest (part)

Demographics

2000 census
As of the census of 2000, there were 21,416 people, 7,060 households, and 5,485 families living in the county. The population density was 8 people per square mile (3/km2). There were 7,862 housing units at an average density of 3 per square mile (1/km2). The racial makeup of the county was 84.69% White, 0.17% Black or African American, 0.80% Native American, 0.37% Asian, 0.05% Pacific Islander, 12.06% from other races, and 1.87% from two or more races. 18.74% of the population were Hispanic or Latino of any race. 23.1% were of English, 13.8% American and 12.9% German ancestry.

There were 7,060 households, out of which 42.40% had children under the age of 18 living with them, 65.20% were married couples living together, 8.80% had a female householder with no husband present, and 22.30% were non-families. 19.50% of all households were made up of individuals, and 9.50% had someone living alone who was 65 years of age or older. The average household size was 2.99 and the average family size was 3.46.

In the county, the population was spread out, with 34.10% under the age of 18, 9.00% from 18 to 24, 24.50% from 25 to 44, 19.60% from 45 to 64, and 12.70% who were 65 years of age or older. The median age was 31 years. For every 100 females, there were 101.20 males. For every 100 females age 18 and over, there were 98.70 males.

The median income for a household in the county was $33,322, and the median income for a family was $38,162. Males had a median income of $29,132 versus $19,851 for females. The per capita income for the county was $14,087. About 11.10% of families and 13.60% of the population were below the poverty line, including 17.60% of those under age 18 and 8.00% of those age 65 or over.

2010 census
As of the 2010 United States Census, there were 22,952 people, 7,666 households, and 5,758 families living in the county. The racial makeup of the county was 81.8% white, 0.8% American Indian, 0.5% Asian, 0.3% black or African American, 0.1% Pacific islander, 14.2% from other races, and 2.3% from two or more races. Those of Hispanic or Latino origin made up 24.9% of the population. In terms of ancestry, 22.3% were English, 11.8% were German, 10.6% were American, and 5.1% were Irish.

Of the 7,666 households, 41.9% had children under the age of 18 living with them, 60.8% were married couples living together, 9.1% had a female householder with no husband present, 24.9% were non-families, and 21.5% of all households were made up of individuals. The average household size was 2.96 and the average family size was 3.46. The median age was 32.0 years.

The median income for a household in the county was $39,866 and the median income for a family was $47,995. Males had a median income of $36,402 versus $22,156 for females. The per capita income for the county was $17,782. About 12.4% of families and 15.4% of the population were below the poverty line, including 18.7% of those under age 18 and 8.1% of those age 65 or over.

Education
Cassia County is served primarily by one school district, Cassia Joint School District #151, which was consolidated in the 1950s.

Schools Located in Cassia County
High Schools
Burley High School in Burley
Cassia Alternative High School in Burley
Declo High School in Declo
Oakley High School in Oakley
Raft River High School in Malta

Jr. High Schools
Burley Jr. High School in Burley
Declo Jr. High School in Declo
Oakley Jr. High School in Oakley
Raft River Jr. High School in Malta

Elementary Schools
Albion Elementary School in Albion
Almo Elementary School in Almo
Declo Elementary in Declo
Dworshak Elementary School in Burley
Evans Elementary School in Burley
Mountain View Elementary School in Burley
Raft River Elementary School in Malta
White Pine Elementary School in Burley

Communities

Cities
Albion
Burley
Declo
Malta
Oakley

Unincorporated communities
Almo
Basin
Connor
Elba
Idahome
Jackson
Marion
Pella
Raft River
Springdale
Sublett
View

See also
National Register of Historic Places listings in Cassia County, Idaho
 USS Cassia County (LST-527) - U.S. Navy ship - 1944-56
 County Parcel Map

References

External links
County website
 County Parcel Map

 

 
Idaho counties
Populated places established in 1879
Burley, Idaho micropolitan area
1879 establishments in Idaho Territory